Nanxi is a town in Jinzhai County, Anhui province, China. , it administers Nanxi Street Neighborhood and the following 11 villages:
Nanxi Village
Yushan Village
Wuwan Village
Dingbu Village
Hengfan Village
Menqian Village
Caofan Village
Mahe Village
Shizhai Village
Nanwan Village
Huayuan Village

See also 
 List of township-level divisions of Anhui

References 

Township-level divisions of Anhui
Jinzhai County